The 1951 Australian Grand Prix was a Formula Libre motor race held at a street circuit in Narrogin, Western Australia on 5 March 1951.

It was the sixteenth Australian Grand Prix and the last to feature a handicap start which saw the slower cars starting ahead of the faster cars according to handicap allowance. The first car over the line was the MG TC special of South Australian Steve Tillett. The Australian Grand Prix title was however to be awarded to the driver setting the fastest outright time, regardless of handicap. The scratch race was won by Warwick Pratley driving a George Reed built Flathead Ford V8 powered racing car. It would be the last Australian Grand Prix victory by an Australian built car until Frank Matich won the 1971 race at the wheel of a Matich A50. Pratley started the race ten minutes and thirty seconds behind the first car to start the race, the Morgan of Colin Uphill. Pratley won the race by 96 seconds over the Delahaye of Dick Bland. Both Tillett and Pratley were awarded Commonwealth Jubilee Trophies for their victories in what was effectively two races in one.

Classification 

Results as follows.

Notes 
Fastest lap: John Crouch (Cooper Mk.IV JAP 1100), 3:51s, 68.57 mph, 110.33 km/h

References

Further reading
Narrogin Observer 9 March 1951, p. 1
  Holland, Keren. (2001) History repeats. Original participants revisit Narrogin and celebrate the 50th anniversary of the 1951 Grand Prix .Narrogin observer, 28 Nov. 2001, p. 1, 14–16

Grand Prix
Australian Grand Prix
Australian Grand Prix